N33 may refer to:

Bus routes 
 N33 (Long Island bus)
 London Buses route N33

Roads 
 N33 road (Belgium), a National Road in Belgium
 N33 road (Ireland)
 N33 road (Netherlands)
 Nebraska Highway 33, in the United States